Barkat Ali Ghulam Hussain Virani, known by his pen name Befām, was Gujarati author and poet especially known for his ghazals.

Life
Barkat Ali was born on 25 November 1923 in Ghanghali village near Sihor in Bhavnagar district. He was interested in literature since age of fourteen when he wrote his first ghazal. He completed his primary and secondary education from Bhavnagar. He was taught poetry by Qismat Qureshi. He left matriculation to participate in 1942 Quit India Movement. He moved to Mumbai in 1945 on suggestion of Shayda. He met Mareez there and was later employed at Aakashvani radio. He married Ruqaiyya, the elder daughter of Shayda, in 1952. He died on 2 January 1994 in Mumbai.

He was associated with Gujarati cinema. He appeared in Gujarati film Mangalfera (1949) and wrote lyrics of several film songs; Akhand Saubhagyavati (1963), Kulvadhu (1997), Jalam Sang Jadeja, Snehbandhan.

Works
He published Ghazal poetry collections; Mansar (1960), Ghata (1970), Pyas (1980), Parab. He has also written short stories, stage plays, radio plays and film songs. His several songs are popular across Gujarat such as "Nayanne Bandh Rakhine", "Thay Sarkhamni To Utarata Chhie", "Milan na Deepak Sahu Buzai Gaya Chhe". Aag Ane Ajawala (1956) and Jivta Soor are two of his Short story collections while Rangsugand parts 1-2 (1966) is a novel by him.

See also
 List of Gujarati-language writers

References

External links
Selected works on MaaGurjari

1923 births
1994 deaths
Gujarati-language writers
Gujarati-language poets
People from Bhavnagar district
20th-century Indian poets
Indian male ghazal singers
20th-century Indian male singers
20th-century Indian singers
Indian male poets
Singers from Gujarat
Poets from Gujarat
20th-century Indian male writers